Mireia Miró Varela  (born 31 July 1988) is a Spanish ski mountaineer and long-distance runner.

Miró was born in Barcelona. She started ski mountaineering in 2005 and competed first in the Cronoescalada race in Cerler in 2006. In the same year she became a member of the national team (Equipo PNTD Esquí de Montaña) and a "high level athlete" of the high sports council of the Spanish government (No. 47.641.303 - Montaña y Escalada).

Selected results

Ski mountaineering 
 2007:
 1st, European Championship "juniors" class single race
 1st, European Championship "juniors" class relay race (together with Kílian Jornet Burgada and Marc Pinsach Rubirola)
 1st, Traça Catalana race "juniors" class
 2009:
 2nd, European Championship vertical race
 2nd, Valtellina Orobie World Cup race
 4th, European Championship team race (together with Izaskun Zubizarreta Guerendiain)
 4th, European Championship relay race (together with Gemma Arró Ribot and Izaskun Zubizarreta Guerendiain)
 4th, European Championship combination ranking
 5th, European Championship single race
 9th (and 2nd in the espoirs ranking), Trophée des Gastlosen (ISMF World Cup), together with Naila Jornet Burgada
 2010:
 4th, World Championship relay race (together with Gemma Arró Ribot and Cristina Bes Ginesta)
 4th, World Championship vertical race
 4th, World Championship team race (together with Gemma Arró Ribot)
 2011:
 1st, World Championship single race
 1st, World Championship vertical race
 3rd, World Championship relay (together with Cristina Bes Ginesta and Gemma Arró Ribot)
 3rd, World Championship vertical, combined ranking
 6th, World Championship sprint
 1st, Tour du Rutor (together with Gloriana Pellissier)
 1st, Mountain Attack
 2012:
 2nd, European Championship single
 2nd, European Championship vertical race
 2nd, European Championship team, together with Gemma Arró Ribot
 2nd, European Championship relay, together with Marta Riba Carlos and Gemma Arró Ribot
 2nd, World Championship vertical, combined ranking
 1st, Patrouille de la Maya, together with Laëtitia Roux and Séverine Pont-Combe

Pierra Menta 

 2010: 2nd, together with Laëtitia Roux
 2011: 1st, together with Laëtitia Roux

Trofeo Mezzalama 

 2011: 2nd, together with Laëtitia Roux and Nathalie Etzensperger

Mountain Running / skyrunning 
 2009:
 1st, Ben Nevis Race
 2nd, Skyrunner World Series

External links 
 Mireia Miró Varela at skimountaineering.org
 Further results
 Personal website

References 

1988 births
Living people
Spanish female ski mountaineers
World ski mountaineering champions
Spanish female long-distance runners
Spanish female mountain runners
Athletes from Barcelona
Spanish sky runners
Ski mountaineers from Catalonia